Oueslatia is a town and commune in the Kairouan Governorate, Tunisia. As of 2004 it had a population of 8,444.  It is also the capital of a delegation with 36,195 inhabitants in the 2006 census.

It is at the center of a plain between the mountainous alignments of Djebel Ousselat and Djebel Serj belonging to the southern flank of the Tunisian ridge.

In addition to the city, the villages of Maarouf, El Menzel, Djebel Serj, Zaghdoud, Djebel Ousselat, Djebel Erreihane, Ain Djeloula, Oum El Ksal and El Behaïer are attached to it.

There are caves, interesting for speleology, like the cave of the mine, as well as numerous cave paintings of which the best preserved represent scenes of hunting where appear rhinoceros, ostriches and buffalos, as many animals which testify of a wetter environment in the Neolithic era.

Thirty kilometers from Oueslatia is the ancient site of Ksar Lemsa where the remains of a fortress of the Byzantine period and a Roman theater are preserved.  Today, a water source is used for the bottling of mineral water .

Notable person
Anis Amri

See also
List of cities in Tunisia

References

Populated places in Kairouan Governorate
Communes of Tunisia
Tunisia geography articles needing translation from French Wikipedia